Jacob Thomas Taylor Peters (born 20 August 2000) is a British swimmer.

He is a Tokyo 2021 Olympian and multiple international medal winning athlete. He swims at Bath Performance Centre under David McNulty.

Final results</ref>

References

2000 births
Living people
Sportspeople from Guildford
British male swimmers
Male butterfly swimmers
European Aquatics Championships medalists in swimming
Commonwealth Games gold medallists for England
Commonwealth Games silver medallists for England
Commonwealth Games medallists in swimming
Swimmers at the 2018 Commonwealth Games
Swimmers at the 2022 Commonwealth Games
Olympic swimmers of Great Britain
Swimmers at the 2020 Summer Olympics
World Aquatics Championships medalists in swimming
21st-century British people
Medallists at the 2018 Commonwealth Games
Medallists at the 2022 Commonwealth Games